The first Günther cabinet was the state government of Schleswig-Holstein from between 2017 and 2022, sworn in after Daniel Günther was elected as Minister-President of Schleswig-Holstein by the members of the Landtag of Schleswig-Holstein. It was the 26th Cabinet of Schleswig-Holstein.

It was formed after the 2017 Schleswig-Holstein state election by the Christian Democratic Union (CDU), Alliance 90/The Greens (GRÜNE) and Free Democratic Party (FDP). Excluding the Minister-President, the cabinet comprised seven ministers. Three were members of the CDU, two were members of the Greens, and two were members of the FDP.

The first Günther cabinet was succeeded by the second Günther cabinet on 29 June 2022.

Formation 

The previous cabinet was a coalition government of the Social Democratic Party, Greens, and South Schleswig Voters' Association led by Minister-President Torsten Albig.

The election took place on 7 May 2017, and resulted in small losses for all three governing parties. The opposition CDU and FDP both recorded a swing toward them, while the AfD debuted at 6%.

Overall, the incumbent coalition lost its majority. The CDU invited the Greens and FDP to exploratory talks, seeking to form a "Jamaica coalition" of the three. The SPD did the same in hopes of forming a traffic light coalition, but the FDP turned down their invitation, citing conflicts with parliamentary leader Ralf Stegner and an unwillingness from the SPD to compromise. Nonetheless, the Greens stated that a government with the SPD and FDP was their preferred outcome.

After exploratory talks, the CDU and FDP both voted to begin negotiations for a Jamaica coalition. The Greens followed on 23 May. The three presented their coalition agreement on 13 June, and formally signed it on the 27th.

Günther was elected Minister-President by the Landtag on 28 June, winning 42 votes out of 73 cast.

Composition

External links

References 

Politics of Schleswig-Holstein
Government of Schleswig-Holstein
Cabinets of Schleswig-Holstein
State governments of Germany
Cabinets established in 2017
2017 establishments in Germany